Lowell Potter "Red" Dawson (December 20, 1906 – June 10, 1983) was an American football coach for the University of Pittsburgh Panthers and the Tulane Green Wave at the collegiate level and the AAFC's Buffalo Bills at the professional level.   He was a native of River Falls, Wisconsin.

He learned the craft of football coaching at the University of Minnesota under Bernie Bierman, his former coach at Tulane.  At Pitt he coached future Pro Football Hall of Famer Joe Schmidt and won Pittsburgh's "Dapper Dan" sports award in 1952.  Dawson's greatest successes as a coach, however, were with Tulane and Buffalo.  His 1939 Tulane squad went through the season undefeated before a disappointing loss to Texas A&M in the Sugar Bowl.  In 1948 his Buffalo Bills team captured the AAFC Eastern Division title in a playoff against the Baltimore Colts, though they ultimately lost the AAFC Championship Game to the Cleveland Browns.   Dawson's final win–loss record was 36–19–4 at Tulane, 9–11–1 at Pittsburgh, and 19–25–4 at Buffalo.

Head coaching record

College

Professional

References

External links
  Pro Football Reference statistics
 

1906 births
1983 deaths
American football quarterbacks
Michigan State Spartans football coaches
Minnesota Golden Gophers football coaches
Pittsburgh Panthers football coaches
Tulane Green Wave football coaches
Tulane Green Wave football players
All-Southern college football players
Players of American football from Minneapolis
Sports coaches from Minneapolis